Timothy Backshall is an English television presenter and journalist, currently employed by ITV Tyne Tees & Border.

Biography
Backshall was originally from Harrogate, North Yorkshire. He now lives near Penrith, Cumbria, with his wife and daughter.

Television
He joined ITV Border in 1997 as a co-presenter of Lookaround. In February 2009 he was redeployed as a correspondent, based in Carlisle, as part of the newly formed ITV Tyne Tees & Border news service.

References

External links
ITV Border's Photos - Meet the team on Facebook

Living people
English television personalities
ITV regional newsreaders and journalists
Year of birth missing (living people)
Place of birth missing (living people)